Omar Sabry (born 5 October 1927) was an Egyptian water polo player. He competed in the men's tournament at the 1952 Summer Olympics.

References

External links
 

1927 births
Possibly living people
Egyptian male water polo players
Olympic water polo players of Egypt
Water polo players at the 1952 Summer Olympics
Place of birth missing (living people)
20th-century Egyptian people